Jenna Wolfe (born Jennifer Wolfeld; February 26, 1974) is a Jamaican-American journalist and personal trainer. From 2007 to 2014, she was a correspondent for NBC's Today, and Sunday co-anchor from 2007 to 2012 and news anchor for Weekend Today from 2012 to 2014. On September 12, 2014, Wolfe left the weekend Today show for a new role as lifestyle and fitness correspondent on the weekday Today show and NBC News.

From September 2017 through August 2022, Wolfe worked with Fox Sports on FS1 as a host of the show First Things First with Kevin Wildes, and Nick Wright. She was also a field correspondent for Yellowstone Live on National Geographic.

Early life and education
Wolfe was born in Kingston, Jamaica, and grew up in Pétion-Ville, Haiti. Her father, Bennet Wolfeld, was Jewish and was born and raised in Puerto Rico. He owned a chain of leather factories in Puerto Rico and moved to Jamaica with his wife when he expanded his operations. Her mother, Sheila Greenfeld, was also Jewish and from New Jersey. Wolfe had a religious upbringing and had her bat mitzvah while living in the islands.

She moved from Jamaica to Haiti when she was five. In 1989, her family moved to the United States. Wolfe attended SUNY Geneseo from 1992 to 1994. She graduated from Binghamton University with Bachelor of Arts degrees in French and English in 1996.

Broadcasting career

From 2004 to 2007, she was the weekend morning sports anchor for WABC's Eyewitness News in New York City where she had a special segment called "Jenna's Beef," in which she editorialized an event from the world of sports that week.  Prior to that, she worked for the Madison Square Garden Network, WPHL-TV in Philadelphia as the first female sportscaster, WICZ-TV in Binghamton, New York, WUHF-TV in Rochester, New York, and the Today Show as an intern.  Aside from her journalistic duties, Wolfe has appeared as a judge on Food Network's Iron Chef America.

Career timeline
 1996–1998: WICZ-TV
 1998–1999: WUHF-TV
 1999–2002: WPHL-TV
 2002-2004: Madison Square Garden Network
 2004–2007: WABC-TV weekend morning sports anchor
 2007–2016: NBC News
 2007–2014: Today correspondent
 2007–2016: NBC News National correspondent
 2007–2012: Weekend Today Sunday co-anchor
 2012: Weekend Today co-anchor
 2012–September 21, 2014: Weekend Today news anchor
 2007–2015: Today fill-in anchor
 2014–2015: Today lifestyle and fitness correspondent
 2017–2022: Fox Sports 1 – First Things First host

Personal life
Wolfe speaks English, French and Haitian Creole. On March 27, 2013, Wolfe publicly came out as a lesbian and announced that she was expecting her first child with her partner, NBC News correspondent Stephanie Gosk. Wolfe and Gosk welcomed a girl in August 2013. Their second daughter was born on February 4, 2015.

See also
 Broadcast network
 LGBT culture in New York City
 List of LGBT people from New York City
 New Yorkers in journalism
 Sports commentary

References

External links
 Jenna Wolfe's All Day Debut
 
 
 Jenna Wolfe Assisting Home Renovators

1974 births
21st-century American Jews
21st-century American women
American exercise instructors
American expatriates in Haiti
American expatriates in Jamaica
American people of Puerto Rican descent
American television reporters and correspondents
American women television journalists
Binghamton University alumni
Fox Sports 1 people
Jamaican emigrants to the United States
Jamaican exercise instructors
Jamaican expatriates in Haiti
Jamaican Jews
Jamaican people of American descent
Jamaican people of Puerto Rican descent
Jamaican television reporters and correspondents
Jewish American journalists
Lesbian entertainers
American LGBT broadcasters
LGBT Jews
American LGBT journalists
Jamaican LGBT people
Living people
NBC News people
New York (state) television reporters
People from Kingston, Jamaica
People from Port-au-Prince
Puerto Rican Jews
State University of New York at Geneseo alumni
Television anchors from New York City
Women sports commentators